Yumnam Jugeshor Singh (born 5 June 1990) is an Indian footballer who plays as a left midfielder for Kenkre FC in the I-League 2nd Division.

See also
Football in India
List of football clubs in India

References

External links

Living people
Indian footballers
Churchill Brothers FC Goa players
1990 births
Footballers from Manipur
Association football midfielders